Silvio Suárez (born 5 January 1969) is a former football defender from Paraguay. His most common position in defense was left-back.

Career

Club
Suárez started his career in the youth divisions of Olimpia and eventually made his way to the first team where he won several national and international championships between 1990 and 1998. In 1998, he was signed by Argentine side Talleres de Córdoba where he was part of the team that won the 1999 Copa CONMEBOL, the only international tournament in the club's history. Suárez returned to Paraguay to play for 12 de Octubre of Itaugua and end his career. In 2008, he came out of retirement to play for 12 de Octubre of Pirayú in the Liga Pirayuense de Deportes. The team was eliminated as it did not pass the qualifying stage of the league and Suárez retired from football for good.

International
Suárez also played for the Paraguay national football team in the Copa América tournaments of 1991, 1993, 1995 and 1999. Suárez made his international debut for Paraguay on 27 February 1991 in a friendly match against Brazil (1–1) in Campo Grande. He obtained a total number of 34 international caps, scoring no goals for the national side.

Honours

Club
 Olimpia
 Paraguayan Primera División: 1993, 1995, 1997
 Copa Libertadores: 1990
 Supercopa Sudamericana: 1990
 Recopa Sudamericana: 1990
 Talleres
 Copa CONMEBOL: 1999

References

External links
 Profile at BDFA  
 Stats in Talleres at Fútbol XXI  
 rsssf

1969 births
Living people
People from San Pedro Department, Paraguay
Paraguayan footballers
Club Olimpia footballers
Talleres de Córdoba footballers
Paraguay international footballers
Paraguayan expatriate footballers
Expatriate footballers in Argentina
1991 Copa América players
1993 Copa América players
1995 Copa América players
1999 Copa América players
Association football fullbacks